South Carolina Highway 22 (SC 22), also known as the Conway Bypass and Veterans Highway, is a four lane freeway that connects US 501 north of Conway, South Carolina, to US 17 in Myrtle Beach. The road was opened to traffic on May 4, 2001, six months ahead of schedule. There is speculation that it could become part of Interstate 73 in the future. The road largely meets Interstate Highway standards, but in order to support increased Interstate traffic, its shoulders would need to be expanded to standard width.

Route Description

History
In 1994, the original contract with Fluor Daniel called for six lanes from US 17 to SC 905 and four lanes the rest of the way to US 501. This money depended on a one-cent sales tax devoted to road funding, but voters turned that down.

A bridge was built over the Intracoastal Waterway near Briarcliffe Acres, but it remained the "Bridge to Nowhere" for three years because there was no money to build the road. In February 1999, the South Carolina Senate passed a bill naming the bridge for Billy Alford, state highway commissioner from 1990 to 1994 and commission chair in 1993.

On February 24, 1999, the South Carolina Department of Transportation Commission approved $95 million to make the bypass four lanes. Two years earlier, since money was short, the bypass had been reduced to two lanes beyond SC 90, though the $291.3 million project had six lanes to SC 31.

Even with the changes, the road would end up being cheaper than planned because of narrower shoulders and bridges, and more bridges over wetlands.

On March 4, 1999, The Joint Bond Review Committee approved selling bonds for the money approved in February. Widening the bridges was considered, since some believed that the road could need six lanes in only a few years.

In June 2000, the first section of the Conway Bypass opened 17 months sooner than expected despite flooding from Hurricane Floyd. In November 2000, the section from SC 90 to SC 905, including a 29-foot-high bridge over the Waccamaw River, opened 13 months sooner than planned. The final section opened with a ribbon cutting ceremony in May 2001.

In 2003, the South Carolina General Assembly approved a resolution asking that the Conway Bypass be designated I-73.

Future
South Carolina Highway 22 is slated to be upgraded to Interstate standards and eventually become the southernmost terminus of Interstate 73 (I-73). I-73 will begin where SC 22 starts at US 17 near Briarcliffe Acres. It will then proceed northwest crossing the proposed routing of I-74 (currently SC 31, the Carolina Bays Parkway). The "I-73 Intermediate Traffic and Revenue Study" by C&M Associates, dated February 2016, was to be presented to state transportation officials March 24, 2016. It included upgrades to SC 22. RIDE III, if approved by voters, would also provide funding for the Southern Evacuation Lifeline.

The current interchange that serves as the western terminus of SC 22 with US 501 is slated to be the starting point for the proposed Southern Evacuation Lifeline, a proposed  limited-access highway which would allow a more direct route west from the southern Strand, while simultaneously, along with SC 22, completing a beltway around the Myrtle Beach area.

Junction list

See also

References

External links

SC 22 at Virginia Highways' South Carolina Highways Annex

022
Transportation in Horry County, South Carolina
Myrtle Beach metropolitan area
Freeways in the United States
Interstate 73